Laura Binetti (born March 6, 1965) is a former professional Canadian female bodybuilder.  She currently lives in Omaha, Nebraska.

Personal life
Binetti stated her favorite bodybuilder is Juliette Bergmann.  She got married and moved to the U.S. to live with her husband in Omaha, Nebraska and expand her fitness consulting business.

Bodybuilding career
After coming fourth in the Jan Tana Classic Binetti retired from bodybuilding.  She tried to make a comeback in 2007 and 2008, but due to medical reasons she withdrew and now focuses on expanding her business in the USA.

Contest history
1986 Steeles City Classic & CNE - 1st (LW)
1986 Ontario Championships - 5th (LW)
1987 Southern Ontario Championships - 1st (LW)
1987 Eastern Canadian Championships - 1st (LW)
1987 Canadian Championships  - 3rd (LW)
1988 Ontario Mixed Pairs Championships - 1st
1988 Canadian Mixed Pairs Championships - 1st
1988 Women's World Amateur Bodybuilding Championships - 7th (LW)
1988 Canadian Championships - 1st (LW)
1989 CNE Invitational - 1st (MW and Overall Winner)
1989 Canadian Championships - 1st (LW and Overall Winner)
1989 IFBB North American Championships - 1st (MW)
1989 IFBB World Amateur Championships - 2nd (MW)
1990 IFBB Ms. International - 4th
1991 IFBB Ms. International - 12th
1993 IFBB Ms. Olympia - 17th
1994 IFBB Grand Prix Canada - 1st
1994 IFBB Ms. International - 8th
1994 IFBB Ms. Olympia - 11th
1995 IFBB Grand Prix Prague - 2nd
1995 IFBB Ms. Olympia - 12th
1996 IFBB Grand Prix Prague - 1st
1996 IFBB Grand Prix Slovakia - 2nd
1997 IFBB Jan Tana Classic - 3rd
1997 IFBB Ms International - 9th
1997 IFBB Ms. Olympia - 13rd
1999 IFBB Ms. International - 8th
1999 IFBB World Pro Championships - 1st
1999 IFBB Ms. Olympia - 8th
2000 IFBB Jan Tana Pro Classic - 4th

References

1965 births
Canadian female bodybuilders
Professional bodybuilders
Living people
Sportspeople from Toronto